Gopalapuram is a village in Ravulapalem Mandal, Dr. B.R. Ambedkar Konaseema district in the state of Andhra Pradesh in India.

Geography 

Demographics 
 India census, Gopalapuram had a population of 9,679, out of which 4,886 were male and 4,793 were female. The population of children below 6 years of age was 10%. The literacy rate of the village was 77%.

References 

Villages in Ravulapalem mandal